Two motor ships have borne the name Stavangerfjord:

  is a 4,856-ton roll-on/roll-off ferry completed in January 2007, by Aker Tulcea, Tulcea, Romania.
  is a 25,000-ton cruisefery completed in July 2013, Bergen Group Fosen, Rissa, Norway.

Steamship 
  was an ocean liner of the Norwegian America Line (1918–1964).  Fuel was first coal, later oil.

References

Ship names